The Needham Whitfield Herring House, also known as Murray House, is a historic plantation house located near Kenansville, Duplin County, North Carolina. It was built in 1853, and is a two-story, three bay, single pile, frame house in the Greek Revival style. It features a handsome double-story pedimented porch.  The house was enlarged about 1890 with the addition of two one-story Queen Anne style hipped roof wings. Also on the property are the contributing carriage house, smokehouse, and barn.

It was listed on the National Register of Historic Places in 1994.

See also
Bryan Whitfield Herring Farm

References

Plantation houses in North Carolina
Houses on the National Register of Historic Places in North Carolina
Greek Revival houses in North Carolina
Queen Anne architecture in North Carolina
Houses completed in 1853
Houses in Duplin County, North Carolina
National Register of Historic Places in Duplin County, North Carolina
Whitfield family residences